The United Refining Company (URC) is an oil company in Warren, Pennsylvania. The company operates an oil refinery in Warren that can process 70,000 barrels of oil into gasoline, diesel fuel and other petroleum distillates per day. It distributes gasoline under the Kwik Fill and Keystone brands.  In early 2019, the American Automobile Association noted that Warren had the most expensive gasoline in Western Pennsylvania, despite the presence of the refinery in the town and a gasoline station just outside the refinery, the root cause of which remains undetermined.

History

The United Refining Company was founded in 1902 by Harry Logan, Sr. His son, Harry Logan, Jr., succeeded his father as president and chairman of United Refining in 1957. In 1981, John Catsimatidis acquired United Refining as a subsidiary of his Red Apple Group.

As of 1935, the company had a pair of marketing subsidiaries, Emblem Oil Company and Red Star Lubrication Service Incorporated, which distributed Keystone Gasoline and Emblem Motor Oils, respectively.

The employees of the Warren refinery are represented by the International Union of Operating Engineers.

Citgo

URC acquired the rights to use the name Citgo in 2002 when it bought a local gas station and convenience store chain called Country Fair, Inc. in Erie, Pennsylvania which included a license agreement to use "Citgo's brands, trademarks and other forms of identification."

After Venezuelan President Hugo Chávez's speech to the United Nations, there were calls to boycott the Citgo brand. In response, URC began phasing out that brandname, and has been emphasizing that its crude oil supply comes from North America. URC also continued rebranding its product under the Kwik Fill and other local names.

Alternate energy
United Refining blends ethanol with its gasoline in accordance with the Energy Policy Act.

Convenience stores
United Refining Company distributes its oil through its line of owned-and-operated convenience stores, totaling approximately 375 throughout upstate New York, Pennsylvania, and Northeast Ohio. The stores operate under the names Kwik Fill, Red Apple, or Country Fair. Many Kwik Fill locations, like the one in the photo above, are full-service, meaning they pump your gas for you.

References

External links
United Refining Co. website

Warren County, Pennsylvania
Privately held companies based in Pennsylvania
Economy of New York (state)
Economy of Ohio
Economy of the Eastern United States
Oil companies of the United States
Convenience stores of the United States
Non-renewable resource companies established in 1902
1902 establishments in Pennsylvania